Scorpion I was a ruler of Upper Egypt during Naqada III. His name may refer to the scorpion goddess Serket, though evidence suggests Serket's rise in popularity to be in the Old Kingdom, bringing doubt to whether Scorpion actually took his name from her. He was one of the first rulers of Ancient Egypt, and a graffiti of him depicts a battle with an unidentified predynastic ruler. His tomb is known for the evidence of early examples of wine consumption in Ancient Egypt.

Tombs
Scorpion is believed to have lived in Thinis one or two centuries before the rule of the better-known Scorpion II of Nekhen and is presumably the first true king of Upper Egypt. To him belongs the U-j tomb found in the royal cemetery of Abydos, where Thinite kings were buried. That tomb was plundered in antiquity, but in it were found many small ivory plaques, each with a hole for tying it to something, and each marked with one or more hieroglyph-type scratched images which are thought to be names of towns, perhaps to tie the offerings and tributes to keep track of which came from which town. Two of those plaques seem to name the towns Baset and Buto, showing that Scorpion's armies had penetrated the Nile Delta. It may be that the conquests of Scorpion started the Egyptian hieroglyphic system by starting a need to keep records in writing.

Battle depiction
In 1995, a 5,000-year-old graffito was discovered in the  Theban Desert Road Survey that also bears the symbols of Scorpion and depicts his victory over another protodynastic ruler (possibly Naqada's king). The defeated king or place named in the graffito was "Bull's Head", a marking also found in U-j. It is believed that Scorpion I unified Upper Egypt following the defeat of Naqada's king.

Evidence of wine consumption
Scorpion's tomb is known in archaeology circles for its possible evidence of ancient wine consumption. In a search of the tomb, archaeologists discovered dozens of imported ceramic jars containing a yellow residue consistent with wine, dated to about 3150 BC. Chemical residues of herbs, tree resins, and other natural substances were found in the jars. Grape seeds, skins and dried pulp were also found in the tomb.

References

32nd-century BC Pharaohs
Year of birth unknown
Year of death unknown
Naqada III